Baptist Mudartha (born 9 Sep 1911 in Mangalore – 30 May 2007) was an Indian clergyman and bishop for the Roman Catholic Diocese of Allahabad. He became ordained in 1942. He was appointed bishop in 1963. He died on 30 May 2007, at the age of 95.

References

1911 births
2007 deaths
People from Mangalore
20th-century Roman Catholic bishops in India
21st-century Roman Catholic bishops in India